Francisco (or Francesc) Sans Castaño (1868–1937) was a Spanish painter and engraver.

He collaborated at the Hojas Selectas magazine.

He took part in the 1882, 1887, 1890, 1899 and 1910 National Exhibitions (winning an honorary mention in that of 1887) and in the 1911 World's Fair, winning a third-class medal.

References 

Painters from Barcelona
1868 births
1937 deaths